is a 1990 beat 'em-up game released for the arcades by Technos Japan Corp (the developers of Renegade and Double Dragon). A home version for the Super Nintendo Entertainment System was also released in 1992.  The game centers on three vigilantes (identified as cyborgs in the SNES port) who must fight against numerous street gangs in futuristic New York City. The SNES version was released for the Wii Virtual Console in North America on November 30, 2009.

Arcade version
The trio of heroes boast a variety of unique techniques in addition to the standard punch and kick combos such as stomping on an opponent, swinging them by their ankles, kicking them on the ground, slamming their faces into the pavement and even the ability to slam the heads of two opponents together. The player can also pick up certain large-sized objects (parked motorcycles, go-karts or pinball machines) and toss them over enemies.

The game can be set up so that it can be played by up to two or three players simultaneously. In the two-player version of the game, the players are asked to select their characters at the character select screen, whereas the three-player version has each player already assigned with a corresponding character.

These three heroic strongmen that are playable are identified as the titular Combatribes, here are their profiles: 
  (who takes his name from postal Old Norse Vikings), the first vigilante with a blonde, spiky mullet-hairdo, and a blue outfit; he is endowed with the balance of an all-around fighter with both speed and strength.
  (who takes his name from an Indian battle axe), the second vigilante with a black, short flattop-hairdo, and a yellow outfit; he is the strongest of the trio, but also has a lack of speed.
  (short for "blitzkrieg"), the third vigilante with a brown, long ponytail-hairdo, and a red outfit; he has the most agile attacks, but lacks the strength of the other two characters.

The game is composed of six different stages (or "Acts" as they're referred within the game) set in unique locations, each featuring a themed gang. The majority of the stages are composed of a single playing field where the player must take on a set number of underlings before facing the gang's leader, similar to Renegade. Some stages break away from this formula by having more than one level. The gangs the player faces are in order: a biker gang in Times Square, circus performers in Coney Island, roller skaters in a dance club, a punk gang in a baseball stadium and a militia in a high-rise building.

The final stage is a boss rush against all the previous gangs while chasing a big crime boss in the harbor. After the gangs are defeated once again, the crime boss is killed by a female cyborg, Martha Splatterhead. Martha then engages the player in a final battle. If two or three players are present by the start of the final battle, an additional clone or two of Martha will appear to match the number of players. All Marthas must be defeated to complete the game.

Home version
The Super NES version of The Combatribes makes a few changes to the game. The game now features story sequences before and after boss battles, as well as an opening intro explaining the plot and a different ending. The gameplay remains the same, with the character's health now represented by a life bar instead of numeric values. There are no weapons to be picked up and thrown in the SNES version, the stages are simpler and some of the enemy characters are missing. The bikers who carried broken bottles in Act One no longer drop their weapons after being sufficiently damaged. The flame-eating boss of Act Two ("Salamander") normally loses range on his torch attack the more damage he takes, while the SNES version keeps him at full strength until he drops it.

Two player moves are also missing: the ability to pick up and carry enemies around, and the ability to repeatedly kick downed opponents. The fifth stage is composed of a boss rush against all the previous gangs before facing the Slaughter Troops. The sixth and final stage is simply the final battle against Martha Splatterhead set atop the rooftop of a high-rise building. The crime boss from the arcade version is missing in the SNES port, which establishes Martha as the leader of the gangs early on instead. Additionally, only one Martha will fight the player, regardless of the number of players present at the final stage.

In addition to the main game, there's a one-on-one versus mode similar to the one featured in the NES version of Double Dragon. The player can perform Street Fighter II-style special techniques including fireballs and block attacks with some characters. The game's enemies and bosses can also be used by inputting passwords given in the main game.

The North American version of the game was further censored, with the blood on enemy's faces during cut scenes being recolored white to look like saliva, sweat and tears. One of the bosses, a cyborg general named Swastika, was renamed "Master Blaster", to remove obvious references to Nazism. The fifth stage gang is renamed "The Demolition Troops" (instead of "The Slaughter Troops"). In the first stage, the "Steak & Brew Burger" in the background is renamed to the "Steak & Shake", to remove alcohol references (even though the original name was likely a reference to coffee rather than beer "brew", given the adjacent sign advertising coffee in both versions).

The Virtual Console re-release in North America was furthered censored, with the enemy organization "Ground Zero" being renamed "Guilty Zero".

Soundtrack
An album containing the original soundtrack for the arcade versions of Double Dragon 3: The Rosetta Stone and this game was released by Pony Canyon in Japan, titled Double Dragon 3/The Combatribes. It was released on June 21, 1991 and its catalog number is PCCB-00065. Tracks 13 to 21 are taken from The Combatribes.

Reception

In Japan, Game Machine listed The Combatribes on their August 1, 1990 issue as being the second most-successful table arcade unit of the month. In the United States, it had a high-earning test market performance around May 1990. Power Unlimited gave a score of 50% writing: "Combat Tribes has everything a game shouldn't have. A bad story, lousy controls, ridiculous characters and much more. Not recommended."

References

External links
 
 
 The Combatribes at Hardcore Gaming 101

1990 video games
Action video games
Arcade video games
Cooperative video games
Science fiction video games
Super Nintendo Entertainment System games
Technōs Japan beat 'em ups
Video games developed in Japan
Video games set in New York City
Virtual Console games
Side-scrolling beat 'em ups